Ajay Singh (born 28 March 1989) is an Indian footballer who plays for Sudeva Delhi FC in the I-League.

Career

JCT
For the 2010-11 I-League season Ajay Singh spent most of his time with the JCT Under-19 squad where he won the 2011 I-League U19 championship. He did though play seven matches and score six goals for the senior team JCT FC in the I-League.

Pailan Arrows
During the summer of 2011 Singh signed with Pailan Arrows who were then Indian Arrows in the I-League. He scored his first and only goal for Pailan Arrows in the I-League on 28 April 2012 against HAL at the Bangalore Football Stadium in the 41st minute as Pailan ran out 2–1 winners.

Churchill Brothers
During the summer of 2012 Singh again moved on and signed for Churchill Brothers who are also of the I-League. He scored his first goal for the club on 4 January 2013 against Shillong Lajong at the Duler Stadium in which he scored in the 55th minute after coming on as a substitute as Churchill Brothers won the match 6–0.

Mohammedan
Singh made his debut for Mohammedan in the I-League on 21 September 2013 against reigning Pune at the Salt Lake Stadium; and played till the 58th minute before he was being replaced by Israil Gurung; as Mohammedan lost the match 1–3.

Lonestar Kashmir
Ajay Singh joined Lonestar Kashmir for 2015 I-League 2nd Division where he played 11 times and scored 11 times.

Mohammedan
Ajay moved back to Mohammedan to play in Calcutta Preimer League later that year before joining up with their squad for the 2015-16 I-League 2nd Division.

Career statistics

Club

References

Indian footballers
1989 births
Living people
People from Rupnagar district
Footballers from Punjab, India
I-League players
JCT FC players
Indian Arrows players
Churchill Brothers FC Goa players
Mohammedan SC (Kolkata) players
Association football forwards
I-League 2nd Division players
Lonestar Kashmir F.C. players
Mohun Bagan AC players
Southern Samity players
Indian Super League players
FC Pune City players
Gokulam Kerala FC players
Sudeva Delhi FC players
NEROCA FC players